Washington County Cooperative Library Services (WCCLS) is the library system serving Washington County, Oregon. WCCLS distributes tax funds to libraries.  It was established in 1975.

Libraries
WCCLS is made up of 16 libraries which are operated by 13 cities and non-profit organizations.

Past WCCLS-affiliated libraries included ones in the former Tanasbourne Mall (when the Tanasbourne area was unincorporated) and, in the 1970s, Aloha Park Library, located in Aloha Park school, which was open to the public one night a week.

In 2019, the Oregon College of Art & Craft Library closed along with the rest of the college. Additionally, the Tuality Health Resource Center closed in August.  These specialty libraries had been affiliated with WCCLS for many years, and some of their collection was distributed to other libraries in the county.

See also

 Library Information Network of Clackamas County
 Multnomah County Library

References

External links
website

 
Library districts
1975 establishments in Oregon